Mohamed Nasir Abbas (born 1996) is a Qatari athlete competing in the 400 and 800 metres.

Competition record

Personal bests

Outdoor
400 metres – 45.59 (Monachil 2016)
800 metres – 1:48.80 (Schifflange 2017)

Indoor
400 metres – 47.14 (Doha 2016)
800 metres – 1:48.07 (Stockholm 2015)

References

1996 births
Living people
Qatari male sprinters
Qatari male middle-distance runners
Athletes (track and field) at the 2014 Asian Games
Athletes (track and field) at the 2018 Asian Games
Asian Indoor Athletics Championships winners
Asian Games gold medalists for Qatar
Asian Games medalists in athletics (track and field)
Medalists at the 2018 Asian Games